Okenia hispanica is a species of sea slug, specifically a dorid nudibranch, a marine gastropod mollusc in the family Goniodorididae.

Distribution
This species was described from the Alboran Sea, Spain.

References

Goniodorididae
Gastropods described in 1995